Should the Baby Live?  The Problem of Handicapped Infants  is a 1985 book by the philosophers Peter Singer and Helga Kuhse, in which the authors examine moral issues surrounding babies born with disabilities, and argue for infanticide in certain cases.

References 

1985 non-fiction books
Books by Peter Singer
English-language books
English non-fiction books
Ethics books
Eugenics books
Medical ethics
Oxford University Press books
Infanticide